Aspidopleres is an African genus of centipedes belonging to the family Oryidae. Centipedes in this genus range from 11 cm to 12 cm in length, have 87 to 105 pairs of legs, and are found in southwest Africa.

Species
Only one accepted species had been described within this genus by 2011: 
 Aspidopleres intercalatus (Porat, 1893) according to Minelli A.

References

Centipede genera
Monotypic arthropod genera
Geophilomorpha
Arthropods of Africa